Javier Romo Oliver (born 6 January 1999) is a Spanish cyclist and triathlete, who currently rides for UCI WorldTeam .

Major results

Triathlon

2017
 2nd Triathlon Junior European Cup
 3rd Spanish National Junior Triathlon Championships
 9th World Triathlon Grand Final
2018
 4th Spanish National Triathlon Championships
 10th European Under-23 Triathlon Championships
2019
 3rd Sprint Triathlon African Cup
 8th Sprint Triathlon European Cup
 9th Spanish National Sprint Triathlon Championships

Road cycling
2020 
 1st  Road race, National Under–23 Road Championships
2021
 5th Overall Settimana Internazionale di Coppi e Bartali
 8th Overall Tour de Hongrie

References

External links

1999 births
Living people
Spanish male cyclists
Cyclists from Castilla-La Mancha
Sportspeople from the Province of Toledo
Spanish male triathletes